A Colores is an LP by Tristeza released on November 22, 2005 by Better Looking Records.

Track listing

Bromas
Balabaristas
Abrazo Distante
La Tierra Sutil
Liquid Pyramids
Halo Heads
Wand
Aereoaviones
Cuchillos De Hielo
Stumble On Air
Harmonic Sea
Palindrome Dome

Personnel 

Christopher Sprague - guitar
Jimmy LaValle - guitar
Luis Hermosillo - bass
James Lehner - drums
Alison Ables - guitar
Sean Ogilvie - keyboards
Recorded by: Bill Skibbe, Jessica Ruffins
Mixed by: Alan Sanderson

Footnotes

External links

2005 albums
Tristeza albums